Ascofuranone is an antibiotic produced by various ascomycete fungi including Acremonium sclerotigenum that inhibits the Trypanosoma brucei alternative oxidase and is a lead compound in efforts to produce other drugs targeting this enzyme for the treatment of sleeping sickness. The compound is effective both in vitro cell culture and in infections in mice.

Ascofuranone has also been reported to have anti-tumor activity, and modulate the immune system.


Biosynthesis 
The proposed biosynthesis of ascofuranone was reported by Kita et al., as well as by Abe et al. The prenylation of orsellinic acid, followed by terminal cyclization through epoxidation is how ascofuranone can be synthesized. Compound (1), ilicicolinic acid B, was found to be produced from polyketide synthase (PKS) StBA and that AscCABD are responsible for the biosynthesis of ilicicolin A (3). Ilicicolin B (2) was found to be produced by expressing AscC (polyketide synthase) which is then followed by expression of AscA (prenyltransferase). AscD (flavin-dependent halogenase, flavin binding enzyme) is able to catalyze the chlorination of ilicicolinic acid B (2) to yield ilicicolin A (3).

Expodiation of (3) by AscE (P450 monooxygenase) leads to the formation of ilicicolin A epoxide (4). Ilicicolin A epoxide can then be hydroxylated by AscH at C-16 (P450 monooygenase) to yield intermediate (5) which can then be cyclized by AscI (eight-transmembrane protein, TPC) into ascofuranol (6), specifically through 6-endo-tet cyclization. Finally, ascofuranol (6) can be oxidized by AscJ (NAD(P)-dependent alcohol dehydrogenase) leading to the formation of ascofuranone.

References 

Antibiotics
Terpeno-phenolic compounds
Aromatic aldehydes
Ketones
Chloroarenes
Tetrahydrofurans
Halogen-containing natural products